Catherine Mary Otto is an echocardiography specialist who serves as J. Ward Kennedy-Hamilton Endowed Chair in Cardiology at the University of Washington Medical Center. She has authored echocardiography textbooks. The major fields she works in are valvular heart disease, adult congenital heart disease, and echocardiography.

Education
She obtained a B.A. from Reed College in 1975, an M.D. from the University of Washington in 1979, and did her residency at The New York Hospital-Cornell Medical Center from 1979 to 1982 in internal medicine and a fellowship in cardiology at the University of Washington from 1982 till 1985.

Career
Otto is an expert on calcific (aortic stenosis) and received the 2011 American College of Cardiology Distinguished Scientist Award (Clinical Domain) for her research on this subject. In addition, Otto is the author of several cardiology books.

In January, 2014, she was appointed editor-in-chief of Heart, the official journal of the British Cardiovascular Society.

Personal
On 29 March 1979, Otto married Robert Frederick Leach in King County, Washington.

Selected publications
 C. Otto and B. Bonow. Valvular Heart Disease, 3rd ed, Elsevier/Saunders, 2009
 C. Otto. Textbook of Clinical Echocardiography, 4th ed, Elsevier, 2009
 D. Oxorn and C. Otto. Atlas of Intraoperative Transesophageal Echocardiography: Surgical and Radiologic Correlations, Elsevier, 2006
 C. Otto. The Practice of Clinical Echocardiography, 3rd edition. Elsevier, 2008
 C. Otto, B. Schwaegler and R. Freeman Echocardiography Review Guide, 2nd ed., Elsevier, 2011
 C. Otto and L. Gillam. 'Advanced Echocardiographic Approaches', Elsevier, 2012

References

External links
 Interview with Catherine Otto about echocardiography

1953 births
Living people
Reed College alumni
University of Washington School of Medicine alumni
Physicians from Washington (state)
American cardiologists
Women cardiologists
University of Washington faculty
Medical journal editors